The following individuals participated in Zion's Camp:

Men

Hazen Aldrich	 
Joseph S. Allen	 
Isaac Allred 
James Allred
Martin Allred	 
Milo Andrus	 
Solomon Angell	 
Allen A. Avery	 
Almon W. Babbitt	 
Alexander Badlam	 
Samuel Baker	
Nathan Bennett Baldwin	 
Elam Barber	 
Israel Barlow	 
Lorenzo D. Barnes	
Edson Barney	 
Royal Barney
Henry Benner 
Samuel Bent	 
Hiram Backman	
Lorenzo Booth
Daniel Bowen	
George W. Brooks	 
Albert Brown 
Harry Brown	 
Samuel Brown	 
John Brownell	 
Peter Buchanan	 
Alden Burdick	 
Harrison Burgess	 
David Byur	
William F. Cahoon	 
John Carpenter	 
John S. Carter	
Daniel Cathcart	 
Alonzo Champlin
Jacob Chapman
William Cherry
John M. Chidester
Alden Childs
Nathaniel Childs
Stephen Childs
Albert Clements
Thomas Colborn
Alanson Colby
Zera S. Cole
Zebedee Coltrin
Libeus T. Coon
Horace Cowan
Lyman Curtis
Mecham Curtis
Solomon W. Denton
Peter Doff
David D. Dort
John Duncan
James Dunn
Philemon Duzette
Philip Ettleman
Bradford W. Elliot
David Elliot
David Evans
Asa Field
Edmund Fisher
Alfred Fisk
Hezekiah Fisk
Elijah Fordham
George Fordham
Frederick Forney
John Fossett
James Foster
Solon Foster 
Jacob Gates 
Benjamin Gifford	 
Levi Gifford	
Sherman Gilbert	 
Tru Glidden
Dean C. Gould	 
Jedediah M. Grant	 
Addison Green	
Michael Griffith	 
Everett Griswold	 
Elisha Groves	 
Joseph Hancock 
Levi W. Hancock	 
Joseph Harmon	 
Henry Herriman	
Martin Harris	
Joseph Hartshorn	 
Thomas Hayes	 
Nelson Higgins	 
Seth Hitchcock	 
Amos Hogers
Chandler Holbrook	 
Joseph Holbrook	 
Milton Holmes	
Ornon Houghton	 
Marshal Hubbard	
Solomon Humphrey	 
Joseph Huntsman	 
John Hustin 
Elias Hutchins	 
Heman T. Hyde	 
Orson Hyde	 
Warren S. Ingalls	 
Edward Ivie 
James Russell Ivie	 
John A. Ivie	
William S. Ivie
William Jessop
Luke Johnson
Lyman E. Johnson
Noah Johnson
Seth Johnson
Isaac Jones
Levi Jones
Charles Kelley
Heber C. Kimball
Samuel Kingsley
Dennis Lake
Jesse B. Lawson
L.S. Lewis
Josiah Littlefield
Lyman O. Littlefield
Waldo Littlefield
Amasa M. Lyman
Moses Martin
Edward W. Marvin
Reuben McBride
Robert McCord
Eleazer Miller
John Miller
Justin Morse
John Murdock
Freeman Nickerson
Levi S. Nickerson
Uriah C. Nickerson
Joseph Nicholas
Joseph B. Noble
Uriah North
Roger Orton
John D. Parker
Warren Parrish
David W. Patten
Orson Pratt
Parley P. Pratt
William D. Pratt
Charles C. Rich	 
Leonard Rich	 
Darwin Richardson	 
Burr Riggs	 
Harpin Riggs
Nathaniel Riggs	
Milcher Riley	 
Alanson Ripley	 
Lewis Robbins	 
Erastus Rudd 
William Henry Sagers
Wilkins Jenkins Salisbury 
Henry Sherman	 
Lyman Sherman	 
Henry Shibley	
Cyrus Smalling	 
Avery Smith	
George A. Smith	 
Hyrum Smith	 
Jackson Smith
Joseph Smith	 
Lyman Smith	 
Sylvester Smith	 
William Smith
Zechariah B. Smith	
Willard Snow
Zerubbabel Snow	
Harvey Stanley	 
Hyrum Stratton	 
Daniel Stephens
Elias Strong
John Joshua Tanner
Nathan Tanner
Ezra Thayer
James L. Thompson
Samuel Thompson
William. P. Tippetts
Tinney Thomas
Nelson Tribbs
Joel Vaughn
Salmon Warner
William Weden
Elias Wells
Alexander Whiteside
Andrew W. Whitlock
Lyman Wight
Eber Wilcox
Sylvester B. Wilkinson
Frederick G. Williams
Alonzo Winchester
Benjamin Winchester
Lupton Winchester
Alvin Winegar
Samuel Winegar
Hiram Winter
Henry Wissmiller
Wilford Woodruff
Brigham Young
Joseph Young

Women

Charlotte Alvord
Mary Chidester
Ada Clements
Sophronia Curtis
Diana Drake
Mary Snow Gates
Eunice Holbrook
Nancy Lambson Holbrook
Mrs. Houghton
 ---?--- Ripley

Children

Eunice Chidester (daughter of John M. Chidester)
John P. Chidester (son of John M. Chidester)
Charlotte Holbrook (daughter of Joseph Holbrook)
Diana Holbrook (daughter of Chandler Holbrook)
Sarah Lucretia Holbrook (daughter of Joseph Holbrook)
Sarah Pulsipher (daughter of Zera Pulsipher)
Almira Winegar (daughter of Samuel Winegar)

References
Joseph Smith (B.H. Roberts ed.) 1902. History of the Church 2:183–185

Zion's Camp participants
Zions cam
1834 in Christianity
Zion's Camp